Rémy René Paul Vercoutre (born 26 June 1980) is a French former professional footballer who played as a goalkeeper. He’s currently the goalkeeping coach of Olympique Lyonnais.

Career
Vercoutre was born in Grande-Synthe, Nord. He previously played for Montpellier, before moving to Lyon in 2002. In 2004, he joined Strasbourg on loan, but only managed to play eight games for them before returning to Lyon. He did however play as they won the 2005 Coupe de la Ligue Final.

Due to Grégory Coupet's injury for the 2007 portion of the 2007–08 Ligue 1 season, Vercoutre became Lyon's first choice keeper and played in every game until Coupet's return. During that time, he made a crucial penalty save from Thomas Hitzlsperger in the UEFA Champions League against Stuttgart, which helped Lyon progress to the round of 16.

After the departure of Hugo Lloris to Tottenham Hotspur in August 2012, Vercoutre became the first choice goalkeeper for Lyon. At the end of the 2012–13 season, however, he lost the first-choice place to Anthony Lopes.

In June 2014, Vercoutre left Lyon 12 years after his arrival to sign a two-year contract with newly promoted Ligue 1 side Caen.

Honours
Lyon
Ligue 1: 2006–07, 2007–08
Coupe de France: 2007–08, 2011–12
Trophée des Champions: 2003, 2005, 2006, 2007, 2012

Strasbourg
Coupe de la Ligue: 2004–05

References

External links

1980 births
Living people
People from Grande-Synthe
Sportspeople from Nord (French department)
French footballers
Association football goalkeepers
Montpellier HSC players
Olympique Lyonnais players
RC Strasbourg Alsace players
Stade Malherbe Caen players
Ligue 1 players
Ligue 2 players
Association football goalkeeping coaches
CF Montréal non-playing staff
Footballers from Hauts-de-France
French expatriate sportspeople in Canada